Yang Berhormat  Haji Anuar bin Abdul Manap is a Malaysian politician. He is a member of the United Malays National Organisation (UMNO) in Malaysia's Barisan Nasional (BN) coalition. Anuar was also the Member of Parliament (MP) for Sekijang in Johor from 2013 to 2018.

Early days
He was born in Kampung Layang-layang, Kluang, Johor on 30 December 1976. His family later moved to Felda Pemanis, Segamat, Johor and he was raised there.

Education
Anuar started studying at Felda Pemanis LKTP Primary School in 1982. He then went to secondary school at Sekolah Menengah Arab Khairiah Gubah Segamat in 1988. In 1991, he continued to study form 4 at Sekolah Menengah Buloh Kasap Segamat.

In 1993, he entered the Sal Group Of Colleague for a Diploma in Information Technology course and subsequently to Charles Sturt University Australia in 1995 for Bachelor of Information Technology.

Politics
In the 2013 general election (GE13), he defeated People's Justice Party (PKR) candidate Julailey Jemadi with a majority of 3,007 votes to win the Sekijang parliamentary seat. 

In the 2018 general election (GE14), he was chosen by UMNO as BN candidate to contest the Johor State Legislative Assembly seat of Kemelah which he had lost.

In the 2022 Johor state election, he won the Pemanis seat with a majority of 4,187.

Private life
He is married to Zaleha bt Yahya and Siti Nurasmah bt Osman, and raised 4 children.

Election results

References

Living people
1976 births
People from Johor
Malaysian people of Malay descent
Malaysian Muslims
United Malays National Organisation politicians
Members of the Dewan Rakyat
21st-century Malaysian politicians